Cantharellus lewisii is a species of fungus in the family Cantharellaceae.

Discovered in 2011, it is found in the Southeastern United States where it associates with floodplain hardwoods. Its name honours American mycologist David Lewis.

References

External links

lewisii
Fungi of the United States
Fungi described in 2011
Fungi without expected TNC conservation status